Lopi may refer to:

Places
 Lõpi, Estonia

Other
 Lopi (book), a former name of the 12th-century Lushi
 Luo Mi (罗泌; 1131–1203), the author of the Lushi
 Lopi language
 Lopi (knitting)